The Sara Lee Corporation was an American consumer-goods company based in Downers Grove, Illinois. It had operations in more than 40 countries and sold its products in over 180 countries. Its international operations were headquartered in Utrecht, The Netherlands. While no longer operated independently, as of 2020, Sara Lee still exists as a current brand name under the auspices of holding company Kohlberg & Company, making frozen cakes, etc. at its present facility in Illinois, United States.

Sara Lee is also the brand name of a number of frozen and packaged foods, often known for the long-running slogan "Everybody doesn't like something, but nobody doesn't like Sara Lee," often incorrectly reported as "Nobody does it like Sara Lee".

As of 2005, Sara Lee Corporation had operations in more than 40 countries; sold food, beverage, and household products in over 180 countries; and had some 137,000 employees worldwide.

On July 4, 2012, Sara Lee Corporation was split into two companies: one for North American operations which would be renamed Hillshire Brands (the Sara Lee name would continue to be used on bakery and certain deli products distributed by Hillshire Brands), the other for international beverage and bakery businesses named D.E Master Blenders 1753.

History
In 1935, Charles Lubin and his brother-in-law, Arthur Gordon, bought a small chain of Chicago neighborhood bakeries called Community Bake Shops. 
Working together, the businessmen expanded their original three stores into a chain of seven bakeries. Lubin wanted to expand the business. He named a cream cheesecake after his eight-year-old daughter, Sara Lee Lubin, and changed the name of the business to Kitchens of Sara Lee.
In 1956, the Consolidated Foods Corporation bought Kitchens of Sara Lee, and it became one of the company's best-known brand names. In 1985, the name Sara Lee Corporation was adopted for the corporation as a whole.

While the company traced its lineage to 1939, when Nathan Cummings acquired C. D. Kenny Company, a wholesale distributor of sugar, coffee, and tea in Baltimore, Consolidated Foods Corporation was actually the descendant of a Chicago grocery store called Sprague, Warner & Company. This enterprise, which started on State Street in Chicago, was founded during the Civil War by Albert A. Sprague and Ezra J. Warner. By 1909, Sprague, Warner & Company was one of the leading wholesale grocery companies in the United States, famous for house brands such as Richelieu, Ferndell, and Batavia. In 1942, this company was acquired by the Canadian-born Cummings. The new Chicago-based company, at first called Sprague Warner–Kenny Corp., ranked as the largest grocery wholesaler in the United States. Annual sales grew from about $20 million in 1942 to $120 million by 1946. After changing its name in 1945 to Consolidated Grocers, Cummings's company became the Consolidated Foods Corporation in 1953.

In 1986, Sara Lee bought the manufacturing and mail order operations of Wolferman's, a maker of English muffins, that dated back to 1888.

In February 1988, Sara Lee agreed to the purchase of the 84-year-old Adams-Millis Corporation of High Point, North Carolina, the largest private label sock and stocking manufacturer in the United States, with 3000 employees and 1987 sales of nearly $200 million.

On June 25, 2001, Sara Lee Corp pleaded guilty to a misdemeanor and agreed to pay $4.4 million for selling tainted meat that was blamed for at least 15 deaths and six miscarriages in 1998; the agreement stressed that Sara Lee's Bil Mar Foods division did not knowingly distribute the tainted meat. On August 7, 2001, Sara Lee Corp cleared the last remaining regulatory hurdle in its purchase of Earthgrains Co, receiving approval from the European Commission (S).

Brenda C. Barnes joined Sara Lee Corporation in July 2004 as the president and chief operating officer. Then in February 2005, Barnes was named president and chief executive officer, and the corporation announced it would move its headquarters from Cincinnati, Ohio, to Downers Grove, Illinois, which housed the company's North American operating businesses and the majority of Sara Lee's corporate staff.

Also in February 2005, the company began executing a multi-year plan to transform Sara Lee into a company focused on its food, beverage, and household and body care businesses around the world. To support that focus, Sara Lee announced plans to dispose of approximately 40 percent of the company's revenues, including its apparel, European packaged meats, US retail coffee and direct selling businesses. On December 22, 2005, Sara Lee Corporation was to delist from Euronext Amsterdam and Euronext Paris stock exchanges, as well as the Swiss Exchange. The company said it was taking the voluntary step due to low trading volumes on those exchanges.

2005 also saw the debut of Sara Lee Soft & Smooth made with whole grain white bread. In October, Barnes succeeded C. Steven McMillan as chairman. The year ended with the sale of the direct selling business to Tupperware.

In 2006, Sara Lee announced a new company wide campaign: "the joy of eating". The campaign was part of a restructuring at Sara Lee.

2006 featured the divestiture of Sara Lee's European meats and European branded apparel businesses. In addition, the corporation spun off to its shareholders the branded apparel, Americas/Asia, business, into a separate, publicly traded company called Hanesbrands Inc.

Including the spin-off, Sara Lee raised more than $3.7 billion in proceeds as part of the company's transformation plan. In addition to the monetary benefits, the company became tightly focused on its core businesses: food, beverage, and household and body care. In 2008, Sara Lee sold off its Direct Store Delivery foodservice coffee business to Farmer Brothers for a reported $45 million.

By 2009, Sara Lee was pursuing the sale of its household and body care business in their continuing effort to focus on core business. In April, Sara Lee launched a state-of-the-art research and development center named The Kitchens of Sara Lee, a  campus at the company's headquarters in Downers Grove.

On September 25, 2009, Sara Lee announced it accepted a binding offer by Unilever for €1.275 billion to sell its global body care and European detergents business. The transaction was approved by EU regulators in November of the following year.

On November 9, 2010, Sara Lee said that by selling its North American Fresh Bakery unit to Grupo Bimbo, it could grow in other areas. The $959 million deal gave Sara Lee the right to continue using the Sara Lee name on frozen desserts and meat products. Grupo Bimbo was to use the Sara Lee name for fresh-baked products around the world except for Western Europe, Australia and New Zealand. The deal also gave Grupo Bimbo 41 baking plants, and the regional brands Grandma Sycamore's, Heiner's and Rainbo.

On January 28, 2011, Sara Lee announced the company would be split into two units. The company said its North American operations (including Jimmy Dean, Ball Park and Hillshire Farm) would take the Hillshire Brands corporate name, while the international beverage and bakery businesses (including Douwe Egberts, Senseo, Pickwick, Maison du Café, L'OR, Café Pilão, and Marcilla) would constitute a separate unit named D.E Master Blenders 1753. Some analysts claimed splitting the business into two units would make a takeover more likely. Stockholders would have equal shares in both companies. In the same month, Sara Lee received noted media attention regarding their strategy to "refocus on the core" to revamp the company. In a Forbes magazine column, Adam Hartung stated Sara Lee could not "cost-cut, refocus or re-align a business to success with no new products and no growth plan". Also, Marcel Smits, interim CEO since Barnes suffered a stroke, became the new CEO, and Jan Bennink director and chairman. The split was completed on July 4, 2012.

The successor company, Hillshire Brands, re-located its headquarters from Downers Grove to Chicago in 2012.  In 2014, Hillshire, along with the Sara Lee operations, was acquired by Tyson Foods. 

On June 1, 2018, Tyson announced that it would sell the Sara Lee, Van's, Chef Pierre and  Bistro Collection brands to Kohlberg & Company. The sale was completed on August 1, forming Sara Lee Frozen Bakery, which will be based in Oakbrook Terrace, Illinois.

Company

Brands
Food

 Ball Park Franks: hot dogs
 Bryan: meats
 Bryan Foods: meats
 CroustiPâte: bakery, European market
 Deli d'Italia: meats
 Deli Perfect: meats
 Emeril: meats
 Galileo: salame, meats (east coast)
 Gallo Salame: meats (San Francisco, west coast)
 Green Hill: sausage
 Hillshire Farm: meats
 Jimmy Dean: pork sausages and meat products
 Kahn's: meats
 King Cotton: meats
 Merrild: Coffee
 Mr. Turkey
 Ortiz: bakery
 R.B. Rice: meats
 Rainbo: bakery
 Rudy's Farm: pork sausage and breakfast sandwiches
 Sara Lee: bakery, condiments, deli cheese, deli meats and frozen sweets
 State Fair: corn dogs
 West Virginia Brand: meats

Beverages

 Butter-Nut Cappuccino:
 Bravo:
 Caboclo:
 Café Continental:
 Café Damasco
 Café do Ponto
 Café Pilão
 Cafitesse
 Chat Noir
 Cain's Coffee
 Douwe Egberts: coffee, tea
 Harris
 Hornimans
 Jacqmotte
 Java Coast
 Kanis & Gunnink
 Kayo
 Laurentis
 Maison du Café
 Marcilla
 Maryland Club
 Merrild
 Moccona
 Natreen
 Natrena
 Paradise
 Piazza d'Oro
 Pickwick: tea
 Prima
 Seleto
 Senseo: coffee machine and coffee pods
 Soley
 Steamers
 Suntipt
 Van Nelle

Divested
Sara Lee Corporation announced in 2006 that it had completed the sale of its branded apparel business in Europe to an affiliate of Sun Capital Partners, Inc. Such brands included Dim, Playtex, Wonderbra, Lovable, Abanderado, Nur Die, Unno and Bellinda.
Sara Lee Corporation announced on Sept 28, 2009, that it had received a binding offer for its Global Body Care and European Detergents to Unilever for €1.275 billion. On June 1, 2010, Sara Lee announced it had completed the sale of its 51 percent stake in its Godrej Sara Lee joint venture to Godrej Consumer Products Ltd. for a total consideration of €185 million ($230 million). On June 15, 2010, the company announced that it had received a binding offer of $153.5 million for its remaining insecticides business. The offer is dependent on European Union antitrust approval; the decision is due May 2, 2011. On July 5, 2010, Sara Lee completed the sale of its Ambi Pur air care business to Procter & Gamble for €320 million. On April 4, 2011, Sara Lee completed the sale of its Kiwi shoe care business to SC Johnson for €245 million. In 2010, Sara Lee completed the sale of White King and Janola brands to Symex for €38 million. In addition, Sara Lee announced the pending sale of its non-Indian insecticides business to SC Johnson for €153.5 million.

In 2010, Sara Lee divested its North American fresh bakery business to Grupo Bimbo.

In 2012, Hillshire Brands sold its Australian bakery operations to McCain Foods.

Discontinued
On November 19, 2008, Sara Lee Corporation, which had acquired "the No. 2 kosher hot dog brand" in 1993, announced that it would close its kosher hot dog and meat processing facility in Chicago, on or before January 30, 2009. Sara Lee decided to exit the kosher meat business and discontinue processing and distributing products made under all of its kosher meat brands, including: Best's Kosher, Sinai Kosher, Shofar and Wilno.

As of early 2019, certain Sara Lee bread and other baked goods products, which had dropped some kosher certifications in 2017, restored them.

Consumer relations
Throughout 2012, Sara Lee contributed $343,600 to a $46 million political campaign known as "The Coalition Against The Costly Food Labeling Proposition, sponsored by Farmers and Food Producers". This organization was set up to oppose a California citizen's initiative, known as Proposition 37, demanding mandatory labeling of foods containing genetically modified ingredients.

The Sara Lee Foundation
The Sara Lee Foundation was founded in 1981 to formalize Sara Lee's dedication to community services.

See also
 List of Illinois companies
 HanesBrands, a former subsidiary of Sara Lee

References

External links

 HanesBrands.com Company Site 
 Nathan Cummings Founder
 Ambi Pur Brand website
 Cruz+Verde Insecticides website

 
Food product brands
Food manufacturers of the United States
Defunct companies based in Chicago
Defunct companies based in Illinois
American companies established in 1939
Food and drink companies established in 1939
Food and drink companies disestablished in 2012
1939 establishments in Illinois
2012 disestablishments in Illinois
Companies based in DuPage County, Illinois
Downers Grove, Illinois
United States National Medal of Arts recipients
Companies formerly listed on the New York Stock Exchange
Grupo Bimbo brands
American brands